The Guwahati–Rajendra Nagar Capital Express is an Express train belonging to East Central Railway zone that runs between  and  in India. It is currently operated with 13245/13246 train numbers four days per week.

Service

The 13247/Capital Express has an average speed of 42 km/hr and covers 949 km in 22h 45m. The 13248/Capital Express has an average speed of 40 km/hr and covers 949 km in 24h.

Route and halts 

The important halts of the train are:

Coach composition

The train has standard ICF rakes with a maximum speed of 110 km/hr. The train consists of 21 coaches:

 1 AC First-class
 2 AC II Tier
 3 AC III Tier
 7 Sleeper coaches
 6 General
 2 Seating cum Luggage Rake

Traction

Both trains are hauled by a Samastipur Loco Shed-based WDM-3A diesel locomotive from Patna to Guwahati and vice versa.

Rake sharing

Train shares its rake with 13245/13246 Capital Express.

See also 

 Rajendra Nagar Terminal railway station
 Guwahati Junction railway station
 Indore–Guwahati Weekly Express
 Capital Express

Notes

External links 

 13247/Capital Express
 13248/Capital Express

References 

Transport in Patna
Transport in Guwahati
Express trains in India
Rail transport in Assam
Rail transport in West Bengal
Rail transport in Bihar
Rail transport in Uttar Pradesh